Šakir Redžepi or Shakjir Redjepi (born 21 October 1987) is a Macedonian retired footballer.

Club career
He previously played for Shkëndija Tetovo, Renova, Sloboda Tuzla, KF Vëllaznimi, Zonguldakspor, Al Taawon, MFK Košice, ACS Poli Timișoara, Honka and PK-35 Vantaa.

References

External links

1987 births
Living people
Sportspeople from Tetovo
Albanian footballers from North Macedonia
Association football central defenders
Macedonian footballers
North Macedonia youth international footballers
North Macedonia under-21 international footballers
KF Shkëndija players
FK Renova players
FK Sloboda Tuzla players
KF Vëllaznimi players
Zonguldakspor footballers
Al-Taawoun FC players
FC VSS Košice players
ACS Poli Timișoara players
FC Honka players
PK-35 Vantaa (men) players
Macedonian First Football League players
Premier League of Bosnia and Herzegovina players
Football Superleague of Kosovo players
Saudi Professional League players
Slovak Super Liga players
Liga II players
Veikkausliiga players
Ykkönen players
Macedonian expatriate footballers
Expatriate footballers in Bosnia and Herzegovina
Macedonian expatriate sportspeople in Bosnia and Herzegovina
Expatriate footballers in Kosovo
Macedonian expatriate sportspeople in Kosovo
Expatriate footballers in Turkey
Macedonian expatriate sportspeople in Turkey
Expatriate footballers in Saudi Arabia
Macedonian expatriate sportspeople in Saudi Arabia
Expatriate footballers in Slovakia
Macedonian expatriate sportspeople in Slovakia
Expatriate footballers in Romania
Macedonian expatriate sportspeople in Romania
Expatriate footballers in Finland
Macedonian expatriate sportspeople in Finland